Mount Athos has an extensive network of footpaths, many of which date back to the Byzantine period. These paths are typically trails designed for human foot traffic and mules, and are not wide enough for motor vehicles. They connect the various monasteries, sketes, cells, kathismas, and hermitages on the peninsula to each other.

History
Many of the footpaths of Mount Athos date back to the Byzantine period. Some are cobblestone paths (kalderimi), while most are dirt trails (monopatia).

Starting in the 1960s, many of the footpaths began to fall into disrepair. However, in the 21st century, the Friends of Mount Athos and other volunteers have been restoring and maintaining the footpaths for pilgrims and monks to use. Today, most of the footpaths are signed, well maintained, and in good condition. The Friends of Mount Athos footpath group also maps out GPX files for the footpaths and monitors their conditions.

Eastern coast

From north to south in order, the footpath network on the eastern coast of the Athonite peninsula takes pilgrims through the following sites.

Helandariou Monastery (interior)
Esphigmenou Monastery
Vatopedi Monastery
 (interior, behind Vatopedi)
Bogoroditsa Skete (interior, behind Pantokratoros)
Pantokratoros Monastery
Skete of Prophet Elijah (interior, behind Pantokratoros)
Stavronikita Monastery
Kapsala (interior, behind Stavronikita)
Koutloumousiou Monastery (interior, behind Karyes)
Skete of Saint Andrew (interior, behind Karyes)
Skete of Saint Panteleimon (interior, behind Koutloumousiou)
Iviron Monastery
 (behind Iviron)
Mylopotamos
Filotheou Monastery (interior)
Karakalou Monastery (interior)
Provata (interior)
Morfonou (port with ferry service)
Lakkoskiti (interior, behind Morfonou)
Great Lavra Monastery

Western coast
From north to south in order, the footpath network on the western coast of the Athonite peninsula takes pilgrims through the following sites. The western coast is steeper and more rugged than the eastern coast.

Zografou Monastery (interior)
Konstamonitou Monastery (interior)
Docheiariou Monastery
Xenophontos Monastery
Evangelismou tis Theotokou
Agiou Panteleimonos Monastery
Xeropotamou Monastery
Dafni (port with ferry service)
Simonos Petras Monastery
Osiou Grigoriou Monastery
Dionysiou Monastery
Agiou Pavlou Monastery
New Skete
Skete of Saint Anne
Vouleftiria
Little St. Anne's Skete
Karoulia (port with ferry service)
Katounakia

Southern coast
The rugged southern coast, which forms the southern slope of the main summit of Mount Athos, is also known as the Desert of Mount Athos, a reference to the Scetis Desert where Christian monasticism had originated. Hesychast hermits have traditionally lived in this area.

From east to west in order, the footpath network takes pilgrims through:

Great Lavra Monastery
Prodromos
Vigla
Chairi (Χαΐρι) Pass; the Cave of Peter the Athonite is located in the Chairi area
Megali Sara (Μεγάλη Σάρα; a scree, or hillside covered by rocks)
Agios Nilos
Agias Triados Skete (Kafsokalyvia, which has a port with ferry service)
Kerasia (interior)
Skete of St. Basil (interior)
Katounakia
Karoulia (port with ferry service)

Way of the Bey
The Way of the Bey ( or ) primarily runs along the Athos peninsular ridge. It starts from Esphigmenou Monastery, reaches its highest point at the peak of Antiathonas (1042 m), and ends at Dionysiou Monastery.

See also
Camino de Santiago
Monastic community of Mount Athos

Bibliography
 (a detailed multilingual map of Mount Athos in English, Greek, and Russian; also contains notes in German, French, Italian, Serbian, Bulgarian, and Romanian)
Thomas, Chris and Howorth, Peter (2022). Encounters on the Holy Mountain. . (stories from Mount Athos)

References

External links

Mount Athos pilgrim maps from Filathonites.org
AllTrails
Avenza Maps
Suggested routes for pilgrims

Mount Athos
Mount Athos
Pilgrimage routes
Cultural landscapes
Mount Athos